Bir Ghbalou is a district of Bouïra Province, Algeria.

Municipalities
The district is further divided into 3 municipalities:
Bir Ghbalou
Raouraoua 
El Khabouzia

Districts of Bouïra Province